Greg Allen (born 27 October 1947 – 2009) was an Australian professional rugby league footballer who played in the 1970s for the Cronulla-Sutherland Sharks in the New South Wales Rugby League competition, as a .

Early career 
Before signing on to the Cronulla-Sutherland club Allen was a strongly built sheep shearer hailing from the country town of Warren in north western New South Wales.

Career playing statistics

Point scoring summary

Matches played

References

External links 
 (archived by web.archive.org) Greg Allen at Sharks Forever site

1947 births
2009 deaths
Australian rugby league players
Cronulla-Sutherland Sharks players
Date of death missing
Rugby league players from Warren, New South Wales
Rugby league props